This is a list of Brazilian television stations.

Networks

Terrestrial 
 TV Cultura – free–to–air network based in São Paulo, focusing on education and culture
 TV Globo – free–to–air network based in Rio de Janeiro, covering both entertainment, sports and journalism
 RedeTV! – free–to–air entertainment channel based in Osasco
 RecordTV – free–to–air network
 Sistema Brasileiro de Televisão (SBT) 
 Band – free–to–air network based in São Paulo
 TV Brasil – free–to–air educational network based in Rio de Janeiro

Satellite and cable 
 CNN Brasil - satellite and cable news channel
 GloboNews - satellite and cable news channel
 BandNews TV – satellite and cable news channel
 Record News  - satellite and cable news channel

Former 
 Rede Tupi - was the first television network in South America.
 Rede Manchete
 TV Excelsior

Stations by states

Amazonas

Bahia

Ceará

Federal District

Goiás

Mato Grosso

Mato Grosso do Sul

Minas Gerais

Pará

Paraná

Pernambuco

Rio de Janeiro

Rio Grande do Sul

Santa Catarina

São Paulo

Tocantins

See also
 List of Brazil over-the-air television networks

References

Brazil
Television networks in Brazil
Stations